The Patriotic Movement for the Republic (MPR-Jamhuriya) is a political party in Niger.

History
The party was launched on 11 October 2015 as a breakaway from the National Movement for the Development of Society.

It did not nominate a presidential candidate for the 2016 general elections, but received 7% of the vote in the National Assembly elections, winning thirteen seats and becoming the fourth-largest party.

Electoral results

President of Niger

National Assembly

References

Political parties in Niger
Political parties established in 2015
2015 establishments in Niger